Erion Braçe (born 2 April 1972) is an Albanian politician who served as the Deputy Prime Minister of Albania since January 2019 until his suspension in September 2021.

Early life 
Erion Braçe was born in Tirana on 2 April 1972. He completed his studies at the University of Tirana’s Faculty of Economy, branching in finance. Braçe worked as a journalist at the Zëri i Popullit newspaper between the years 1993–1997 and served as the paper's Editor-in-chief from 1998 to 2007.

Political career 
In 1994, Braçe became a member of the Socialist Party's General Steering Committee. Between 1997 and 2001 he was a member of the Committee on Economy, Finance and Privatization. He has been elected as member of the Albanian Parliament for six legislatures and previously served as Chairman of the Committee on Economy and Finances. He was appointed Deputy Prime Minister on 28 December 2018 and was confirmed by a presidential decree on 4 January 2019 until his suspension in September 2021.

Private life 
Braçe is married and has a daughter and a son.

References 

1972 births
Living people
Politicians from Tirana
21st-century Albanian politicians
Government ministers of Albania
Deputy Prime Ministers of Albania
Socialist Party of Albania politicians
University of Tirana alumni